is a railway station on the Ibusuki Makurazaki Line in Ibusuki, Kagoshima, Japan, operated by Kyushu Railway Company (JR Kyushu). The station opened in 1934.

Line 
Ibusuki Station is served by the Ibusuki Makurazaki Line.

Layout

Adjacent stations

History
The station opened on 19 December 1934. With the privatization of Japanese National Railways (JNR) on 1 April 1987, the station came under the control of JR Kyushu.

History
In the next phase of expansion, the track was extended further south and Ibusuki opened as the new southern terminus on 19 December 1934. On 31 October 1963, the line which served the station was renamed the Ibusuki Makurazaki Line. With the privatization of Japanese National Railways (JNR), the successor of JGR, on 1 April 1987, the station came under the control of JR Kyushu.

Surrounding area
Ibusuki City Hall
Ibusuki Onsen

See also
 List of railway stations in Japan

References

External links

 JR Kyushu station information 

Ibusuki, Kagoshima
Stations of Kyushu Railway Company
Railway stations in Kagoshima Prefecture
Railway stations in Japan opened in 1934